Camphora glandulifera, common name false camphor tree or Nepal camphor tree, is a tree in the genus Cinnamomum of the family Lauraceae.

Description
Flowering period extends from March through May and the fruits ripen from July to September. The leaves have a characteristic smell and contain camphor and essential oils.

Distribution
This plant is native to China, Bhutan, India, Malaysia, Myanmar, and Nepal.

Habitat

References

Further reading

External links
 Schede di Botanica
 Plantes Botanique
 The Plant List

glandulifera
Trees of Bhutan
Trees of Myanmar
Trees of China
Flora of India (region)
Flora of Peninsular Malaysia
Trees of Nepal